Under the Midnight Sun is the eleventh studio album by the British rock band The Cult, released on 7 October 2022 through Black Hill Records. The record was produced by Tom Dalgety primarily at Rockfield Studios, where the band had recorded their debut album Dreamtime in 1984.

Background
In a June 2019 interview with LA Weekly, vocalist Ian Astbury stated that The Cult were “long overdue” to release new music, noting that “we do have some stuff we've been working on, but it's yet to see the light of day." Six months later, Astbury told Atlantic City Weekly that the band was going to start working on new music in 2020, saying “we've got a few pieces lying around in various stages of completion. The intention is to get together in the New Year and take a look at what we've got and decide how we are going to go about moving forward. It's an essential part of any creative lifeblood.” On May 6, 2020, The Cult announced on their Twitter page that they had signed to Black Hill Records.

On August 15, 2020, guitarist Billy Duffy announced on his Twitter that the band had begun recording with producer Tom Dalgety at Rockfield Studios. Progress was slow for nearly two years, hampered by the COVID-19 pandemic, and the album being recorded remotely, with the half of the band tracking it at Rockfield Studios and Astbury in the United States. In May 2022, Duffy told The Yorkshire Post that the ‘main bulk’ of the album was finished and mastered. On July 7, 2022 the band announced the album title and released “Give Me Mercy” as its first single. Astbury said of the single, “it perfectly fit these thoughts I’d been having about our culture’s need to move past assumptions of duality. We need new language because words can’t express where we’re going.”

The album name is said to have come from Astbury’s experience during the 1986 Provinssirock festival in Finland. Astbury was quoted recollecting about the event: “It’s three in the morning, the sun’s up, and there’s all these beautiful people in this halcyon moment. People are laying on the grass, making out, drinking, smoking. It was an incredible moment. When the world stopped [for the pandemic], I had this moment to write in real time, to calculate. I was compelled by this vision, this anomaly, this memory, of being under the midnight sun.”

Reception

Under the Midnight Sun has received generally mixed to positive reviews from critics. Blabbermouth.net contributor Dom Lawson praised the new album, noting that it “imagines a new strain of muscular rock, where psychedelic string sections, the desert-bound twang of Duffy's guitar and prosaic but gripping melodies drift in and out of the motoring throng.” Similarly, Classic Rock writer Dave Everley mentioned that “there are moments [in the album] that are as good as anything The Cult recorded back in their 80s heyday.”

On a more critical level, AllMusic writer Thom Jurek commented that the album “is solid but also has a real shortcoming: it lacks musical diversity. Too many of these melodies are similar enough that they're indistinguishable from one another.” Additionally, The Telegraph contributor Nick Ruskell said that “for much of its second half, [the album’s] magic doesn’t catch quite so well.” Yet, John Garrat of PopMatters more clearly noted that the album’s “second half is sturdier overall, though it lacks the first half’s proportions of highs and lows.”

Track listing
All songs written by Ian Astbury and Billy Duffy, except where noted.
 "Mirror" (Astbury, Duffy, and Tom Dalgety) - 3:48
 "A Cut Inside" - 3:59
 "Vendetta X" - 3:23
 "Give Me Mercy" (Astbury, Duffy, and Dalgety) - 3:37
 "Outer Heaven" (Astbury, Duffy, and Dalgety) - 4:54
 "Knife Through Butterfly Heart" - 6:04
 "Impermanence" (Astbury, Duffy, and Dalgety) - 4:13
 "Under the Midnight Sun" (Astbury, Duffy, and Dalgety) - 5:04

Personnel 
The Cult
 Ian Astbury - vocals & percussion
 Billy Duffy - electric & acoustic guitar
Additional personnel 
 Charlie Jones - electric & upright bass
 Ian Matthews - drums & percussion
 Damon Fox - grand piano & Fender Rhodes
 Tom Dalgety - additional guitars & keyboards
Technical
 Engineered by Tom Dalgety, Jack Boston, Eric Milos, & Scott Ryper
 Mastered by Howie Weinberg

References 

The Cult albums
2022 albums